The Beaver Falls Bees was the predominant name of  a minor league baseball team located in Beaver Falls, Pennsylvania between 1937 and 1941. The team can be traced back to 1931 as the Beaver Falls Beavers who first played in the Middle Atlantic League. An earlier traceable Beavers team played in the Western Pennsylvania League in 1907. In 1937, Bees were an affiliate of the Boston Bees in the Pennsylvania State Association. The team then changed its name each year between the Bees and the Beaver Falls Browns.

Notable alumni

George Barnicle
Bob Barr
Bill Burgo
Rags Faircloth
Nick Goulish
Earl Jones
Lou Lucier
Red Nonnenkamp
Saul Rogovin
Chet Ross
Jim Russell
Bill Strickland
Whitey Wietelmann

References

Baseball teams established in 1907
Baseball teams disestablished in 1941
Defunct minor league baseball teams
Boston Bees minor league affiliates
St. Louis Browns minor league affiliates
1931 establishments in Pennsylvania
1941 disestablishments in Pennsylvania
Defunct baseball teams in Pennsylvania
Pennsylvania State Association teams